Pocket Power Stations were an early commercial use of Gas Turbine engines (Bristol Proteus), by the South Western Electricity Board, to generate electricity for the grid. They were the world's first unmanned electricity generation stations.

References

External links
Proteus Turbo Generator For World's First Unmanned Power Station
BBC Pocket Power Station

Pocket